Laetitia Moma Bassoko (born 9 October 1993) is a Cameroonian volleyball player. She is a member of the Cameroon women's national volleyball team.

She was playing for VBC Chamalières in 2014 and was part of the Cameroonian national team at the 2014 FIVB Volleyball Women's World Championship in Italy and at the 2016 Olympic Games in Rio de Janeiro.

Clubs
  VBC Chamalières (2014)
  Stella ES Calais (2015–2016)
  GS Caltex Seoul KIXX (2021)
  Hóa chất Đức Giang Hà Nội (2022)

References

External links

1993 births
Living people
Cameroonian women's volleyball players
Place of birth missing (living people)
Olympic volleyball players of Cameroon
Volleyball players at the 2016 Summer Olympics
Wing spikers
Cameroonian expatriate sportspeople
Expatriate volleyball players in France
Cameroonian expatriates in France